Samuel Barff (27 August 1793 – 1 September 1880) was a banker and a supporter of Greek independence.

Life
Barff was born about 1793, possibly in England. In 1816 he established himself at Zante, became an eminent merchant and banker, and terminated a long career in that island, 1 September 1880, at the age of eighty-seven.

Greek independence
Barff took an active part in the struggle for Greek War of Independence and was one of the last of the Englishmen connected with that movement. His reputation for honour, kindliness, and fairness, is expressed in a series of letters addressed to him from Missolonghi by Lord Byron early in 1824, which are preserved in Moore's 'Life of Lord Byron.' Barff was counted on to manage funds and provide support for Englishmen in Greece. Barff also served as a mediator between the government and Georgio Sisseni, the leader of the district around Gastruni.

Barff was a friend of Lord Byron, offering his country house to Lord Byron in the event of the health of the latter requiring his removal from Missolonghi.

References

1793 births
1880 deaths
Philhellenes in the Greek War of Independence
19th-century English people
History of Zakynthos